Aminath Rishfa is a Maldivian actress.

Career 
Rishfa made her screen debut in a video song, "Heela Beleema" starred opposite Mohamed Manik and produced by Udhares Latheef. After featuring in several short films and series, Rishfa collaborated with Hussain Munawwar for his second direction, revenge thriller film Dhilakani (2013) along with Ismail Rasheed, Niuma Mohamed, Mohamed Manik and Mohamed Faisal. The film deals with a man's tumultuous journey to seek vengeance and the demolition of family bond over a girl. The film attracted negative reception from critics while Nadheem wrote: "Embraced with futile characters, impractical scenes and out-dated music, the film has problems in each department whereas Munawwar failed to extract the talent of skillful actors". Despite negative reviews, Rishfa was bestowed with the Best Female Debut award at the 3rd Maldives Film Awards while nominated as the Best Supporting Actress.

In 2015, Rishfa appeared in Ali Seezan's action film Ahsham. The film along with her performance as Maeesha, a nurse, received mixed reviews from critics. The film, made on a budget of MVR 1,500,000, was considered as the most expensive film made in Maldives. It was one of the three entries from Maldives to the SAARC Film Festival in 2016. She then collaborated with Fathimath Nahula for two television drama series. In the first release, a 15-episodes romantic series Vakivumuge Kurin, Rishfa portrayed an irresponsible sister who marries a drug addict. This was followed by Nahula's 13 episodes drama series, Umurah Salaan (2015) which centers on a squabble family which is separated due to the greed for money and misunderstandings. The series which stars Mohamed Faisal, Rishfa, Ahmed Azmeel and Mariyam Azza in lead roles, she portrays the character Reesha, an impotent young woman who deals with a dark past and is afraid to step-up in life. Her next appearance was Hussain Munawwar's Neyngi Yaaru Vakivee (2016) alongside Ahmed Azmeel. Critics panned the film and considered Rishfa's performance as Reema "boring" while criticising the character development. Despite the negative reviews, the film did an average business at the end of its run.

Abdul Fatthah's romantic drama Hahdhu was Rishfa's next film release. She was paid MVR45,000 for the role in the film. The film touched upon controversial issues in the Maldives including the depiction of flogging and also shines a light on mental health by featuring an attempted suicide. Rishfa played the role of Zamha, a single mother whose husband died from a car accident. A reviewer from Avas rated her performance 7 out of 10 and wrote: "This is easily Rishfa's best performance till date, a vast improvement from her previous ventures". The film opened to mixed reviews from critics though it emerged as one of the highest grossing Maldivian films of the year.

2018 was a dull year for Maldivian film-industry with regards to 2018 Maldivian presidential election. Her only release of the year was the first Maldivian web-series, a romantic drama by Fathimath Nahula, Huvaa. The series consisting of sixty episodes and streamed through the digital platform Baiskoafu, centers around a happy and radiant family which breaks into despairing pieces after a tragic incident that led to an unaccountable loss. The series and her performance as a young woman who gets pregnant in an extramarital affair and deals with a love betrayal were positively received.

Rishfa's first release of 2019 was the Moomin Fuad-directed psychological horror thriller Nivairoalhi (2019) which marks Niuma Mohamed's last onscreen film. Revolving around a patient suffering from depression, Rishfa played the role of a doctor. 
Starring opposite Mohamed, Yoosuf Shafeeu and Ahmed Asim, the film received majorly positive reviews from critics; Aishath Maaha of Dho? favored the performance of the lead actors and mentioned the "neat arrangement" of its screenplay though pointed out its "weak ending" to be unsatisfactory. Later during the year, first Maldivian anthology film was released which featured Rishfa as a helpless pregnant woman in the segment directed by Farooq, titled Gaathil. The project was shot in 2013 and digitally released six years later due to several delays in post-production.
She has been Arrested on 11 November 2022 along with 12 other people for possession and use of party Drugs and given a 5 day jail period for the time being.

Media image
In 2018, Rishfa was ranked in the eighth position from Dho?'s list of Top Ten Actresses of Maldives where writer Aishath Maaha opined that Rishfa is a "successful" actress who becomes "relevant even after a long gap of absence".

Filmography

Feature film

Television

Discography

Accolades

References

External links
 

Living people
People from Malé
21st-century Maldivian actresses
Maldivian film actresses
Year of birth missing (living people)